Bizkaia–Durango is a professional cycling team based in Spain, which competes in elite road bicycle racing events such as the UCI Women's World Tour.

Team history

2014
Bizkaia–Durango was active during 2014 in women's road cycling. On October 30, current Brazilian National Time Trial champion, Márcia Fernandes, was suspended for two years for returning a positive doping test for EPO by the Brazilian cycling federation.

2015
For the 2015 season the team signed; Coral Casado, Elisabet Escursell, Paula Lanz and Alba Teruel. On November 22 the Lierni Lekuona, Lourdes Oyarbide and Ainara Sanz signed extensions with the team. On December 4, the team signed Samara Sheppard and offered extensions to Anna Ramírez, Mayalen Noriega and Dorleta Eskamendi.

2016
In 2016, the team was joined by Mauritian rider Kimberley Le Court, previously with British team .

Team roster

Major wins

2004
Stage 5 Tour de l'Aude Cycliste Féminin, Ghita Beltman
Durango-Durango Emakumeen Saria, Joane Somarriba
Overall Emakumeen Euskal Bira, Joane Somarriba
Stages 2, 3a & 3b, Joane Somarriba
2005
Overall & Stage 2b Trophée d'Or Féminin, Joane Somarriba
2006
Handzame, Emma Johansson
2007
Stage 5 Emakumeen Euskal Bira, Gema Pascual
Stage 2 La Route de France, Aran Azpiroz
2011
Stage 2 Giro Donne, Shara Gillow
2013
Bergara–Osintxu, Irene San Sebastian
2014
Grand Prix of Maykop, Yulia Ilinykh
Stage 2 Tour de San Luis, Clemilda Fernandes
2015
Stage 2 Tour of Adygeya, Elena Utrobina
Stages 2 & 3 Vuelta a Burgos Feminas, Yulia Ilinykh
Matiena-Abadiño, Yulia Ilinykh
Campeonato de Euskadi, Yulia Ilinykh
Zalla Road Race, Margarita Victoria García
2016
 Overall Vuelta a Burgos Feminas, Margarita Victoria García
Stage 1, Margarita Victoria García
Gran Premio Comunidad de Cantabria, Margarita Victoria García
Trofeo Gobierno de La Rioja, Margarita Victoria García
Trofeo Ria de Marin, Margarita Victoria García
Zizurkil-Villabona Sari Nagusia, Margarita Victoria García
2017
Gran Premio Costa Blanca Calpe, Lourdes Oyarbide
Grand Premio Ciudad de Alcobendas, Lourdes Oyarbide
Stage 2 Vuelta a Burgos Feminas, Lourdes Oyarbide
Stage 4 Vuelta Internacional Femenina a Costa Rica, Paola Muñoz
Trofeo Iturmendi, Lourdes Oyarbide
Sopelana (Torneo Euskaldun), Lourdes Oyarbide
Tolosa, Lourdes Oyarbide
Overall Bestmed Jock Tour, Carla Oberholzer
Stages 2 & 3, Carla Oberholzer
Trofeo Gobierno de La Rioja, Margarita Victoria García
2018
Zeberio Cyclo-cross, Alice Maria Arzuffi
Zizurkil Cyclo-cross, Lucía González Blanco
Deba Cyclo-cross, Cristina Martínez
Lakuntza Cyclo-cross, Alice Maria Arzuffi
Kreiz Breizh Elites Dames, Dani Christmas
2019
Mountains classification Rás na mBan, Natalie Grinczer
Llodio Cyclo-cross, Lucía González Blanco
Elorrio Cyclo-cross, Lucía González Blanco
Les Franqueses del Vallès Cyclo-cross, Lucía González Blanco
Manlleu Cyclo-cross, Lucía González Blanco
Vic Cyclo-cross, Lucía González Blanco
Abadiano Cyclo-cross, Lucía González Blanco
Pontevedra Cyclo-cross, Lucía González Blanco
Ametzaga de Zuia Cyclo-cross, Lucía González Blanco
Igorre Cyclo-cross, Lucía González Blanco
Valencia Cyclo-cross, Lucía González Blanco
Coulounieix-Chamiers Cyclo-cross, Lucía González Blanco
2020
Sueca Cyclo-cross, Lucía González Blanco
Xàtiva Cyclo-cross, Lucía González Blanco
Valencia Cyclo-cross, Lucía González Blanco
2021
Stage 2 Setmana Ciclista Valenciana, Sandra Alonso
Les Franqueses del Vallès Cyclo-cross, Lucía González Blanco
Pontevedra Cyclo-cross, Lucía González Blanco
Marín Cyclo-cross, Lucía González Blanco
Karrantza Cyclo-cross, Lucía González Blanco
Xàtiva Cyclo-cross, Lucía González Blanco
Valencia Cyclo-cross, Lucía González Blanco

National and continental champions

2009 
 Spain Time Trial, Gema Pascual Torrecilla
2010
 Slovenia Road Race, Polona Batagelj
2011
 Slovenia Road Race, Polona Batagelj
2012
 Pan American Track (Points race), Paola Muñoz
 Pan American Track (Scratch race), Lilibeth Chacón
 Spain Time Trial, Anna Sanchis
 Chile Time Trial, Paola Muñoz
 Spain Road Race, Anna Sanchis
2013
 Spain Time Trial, Anna Sanchis
 Spain Road Race, Ane Santesteban
 Slovenia Road Race, Polona Batagelj
2014
 Spain Time Trial, Leire Olaberria
 Hungary Time Trial, Veronika Anna Kormos
 Spain Road Race, Anna Ramírez
 Brazil Time Trial, Márcia Fernandes
2016
 Spain Road Race, Margarita García
 Mauritius Road Race, Kimberly Le Court de Billot
2017
 Namibia Road Race, Vera Adrian
 Namibia Time Trial, Vera Adrian
 Spain Time Trial, Lourdes Oyarbide
 Chile Time Trial, Paola Muñoz
2019
 Spain U23 Cyclo-cross, Luisa Ibarrola
 Japan Track (500m Time Trial), Miho Yoshikawa
 Spain Track (Individual Pursuit), Sandra Alonso
 Spain Track (Team Pursuit), Aroa Gorostiza
2020
 Spain Cyclo-cross, Lucía González
2021
 Spain Cyclo-cross, Lucía González
 Portugal Time Trial, Daniela Campos
2022
 Spain Cyclo-cross, Lucía González
 Chile Time Trial, Catalina Soto Campos
 Portugal Time Trial, Daniela Campos
 Portugal Road Race, Daniela Campos

References

External links

Cycling teams based in Spain
UCI Women's Teams
Cycling teams established in 2004
2004 establishments in Spain
Cycle racing in the Basque Country (autonomous community)
Sport in Biscay